Nouhaila Benzina (born 11 May 1998) is a Moroccan footballer who plays as a defender for ASFAR and the Morocco women's national team.

Club career
Benzina has played for ASFAR in Morocco.

International career
Benzina has capped for Morocco at under-20 and senior levels.

See also
List of Morocco women's international footballers

References

External links

1998 births
Living people
Moroccan women's footballers
Women's association football defenders
Morocco women's international footballers
Moroccan Muslims